Everything Is Terrible! is an artist collective based in Los Angeles that finds and manipulates unusual, dated, and campy clips of VHS tapes from the late 20th century and early 21st century. It was founded in 2007 by a group of friends who met at Ohio University in the early 2000s. The collective has posted daily on a  blogger-hosted website since it was founded.

Activity and reception
According to NPR, they search thrift stores, garage sales, and bargain bins for the worst and most outrageous VHS tapes The website was launched in 2007. The group has been attempting to amass the largest collection of Jerry Maguire on VHS; according to member Ghoul Skool: "We always have noticed since the beginning that there seems to be nothing but just Jerry Maguire tapes filling our nation's thrift stores. I don't know why". Collective members keep a tally of tapes and a leaderboard of contributors on their website watch.everythingisterrible.com. In January 2017, the group opened their Jerry Maguire Video Store at iam8bit Gallery in Los Angeles. At the time of the installation, the number of Jerry Maguire VHS tapes collected was 14,000.  Donations are accepted via mail to P.O. Box 50825, Los Angeles, CA 90050. As of August 20, 2022, the group has gathered an estimated 35-40,000 Jerry Maguire VHS tapes, but their final goal is to build a pyramid in the desert made out of those tapes. 

In addition to posting videos online of re-edited footage, the people behind Everything Is Terrible! have created 8 feature-length, psychedelic found-footage documentaries.  In 2009, the group released its first film titled Everything Is Terrible! The Movie is the same type of VHS clips that would be featured on their website. The A.V. Club called the video "a portal into a world halfway between showbiz and real-life—a look at how the people who make entertainment for a living think the rest of us saps actually live", adding that it's "simultaneously enlightening, hilarious, and deeply sad". Paste magazine called the film "the best (worst?) clips from a range of categories and spin them together like a terrible salad". Wired has praised one of the collective's more popular clips titled "Infomercial Hell" – a series of clips from different infomercials pasted together – calling it "depressing" as well as "terribly funny". Since 2009, they have also toured extensively in the US, Canada, and Europe, showing their films and performing a puppet variety show. In 2019 they opened their "semi-fake" East Los Angeles storefront at 754 S. Atlantic Blvd to the public, which stores their VHS and DVD collection as well as immersive installations.

Notable videos
One of their more notable videos has been an instructional clip titled "So Your Cat Wants a Massage?" – a video that was designed to show people how to massage a cat; it has amassed over 4 million views on YouTube. The video's creator, Mary jean Ballner, has since appeared as a guest on the Late Show with David Letterman on December 9, 2009. According to Ghoul Skool, despite her feelings that "YouTube can be a very negative place", Ballner thanked Everything Is Terrible! for bringing back something which she had not seen in over 15 years.

Other notable videos have included an edutainment clip about a dinosaur named Yello Dyno who, while dressed in a leather jacket and sunglasses, teaches children to protect themselves from pedophiles. Videos from Everything Is Terrible! have also been featured on the comedy show Tosh.0, in which the show's blog has posted the website's request for any available Jerry Maguire tape. Other videos have included a rejuvenating mask infomercial that featured Joe Cocker's "You Are So Beautiful" (which, according to the Chicago Tribune, helped launch the site in 2007), a direct-to-video crime drama featuring Jay Leno, and a video that features babies singing "Ten Little Indians" that was followed by, according to The Huffington Post, "what can only be described as 'A Clockwork Orange' reel for toddlers".

Filmography

Video Series
 Everything Is Terrible! (2007–present)
 Memory Hole (2014–present)

Films
 Everything Is Terrible! The Movie (2009)
 2Everything 2Terrible 2: Tokyo Drift (2010)
 Doggiewoggiez! Poochiewoochiez! (2012)
 Everything Is Terrible! Holiday Special (2012)
 EIT! Does the Hip-Hop Vol. 1: Gettin' a Bad Rap! (2013)
 Comic Relief Zero (2013)
 Everything Is Terrible! Legends (2015)
 The Great Satan (2018)
 Kidz Klub! (2022)

TV pilots
Gigglefudge, USA! (2016; in co-production with PFFR)

In other media
Two of Everything Is Terrible! founders, Nicholas Maier and Dimitri Simakis, created and wrote a live-action television pilot starring Paul Reubens and Eric Bauza entitled Gigglefudge, USA!, which premiered in April 2016 on Adult Swim. Reubens act as a TV host who introduces videos taken from Memory Hole (a previous collective title).

See also
Found Footage Festival
Derrick Beckles, creator of TV Carnage
Tim & Eric
Red Letter Media

References

Online mass media companies of the United States
Video blogs
American artist groups and collectives
YouTube channels
Internet properties established in 2007
Audiovisual ephemera
Film production companies of the United States
Companies based in Los Angeles